Callum Alexandré Izzard (born 23 February 1995) is an English television personality. In 2018, he began appearing as a holiday rep on the ITV2 reality series Ibiza Weekender and has since appeared on several other series including Celebs Go Dating, Ex on the Beach: Peak of Love, Celebrity Ghost Trip and Celebrity Karaoke Club.

Early life 
Izzard was born on 23 February 1995 in Sheffield, Yorkshire.

Television career
In 2018, Izzard joined the cast of the ITV2 reality television series Ibiza Weekender as assistant head rep. He later returned for the ninth and tenth series in 2019 and 2020 respectively. In October 2018, Izzard appeared on the fifth series of the E4 dating series Celebs Go Dating.

In December 2019, Izzard was a cast member on Ex on the Beach: Peak of Love, the spin-off of the MTV series Ex on the Beach that was filmed earlier in the year, where he was joined by two of his former girlfriends, Megan Nash and Paris Decaro. During the show, he began a relationship with fellow cast member Georgia Steel, whom he later proposed to on the set of the show. They split in April 2020, after seven months together.

In October 2021, Izzard was a contestant on Celebrity Ghost Trip, the Halloween spin-off of Celebrity Coach Trip,  alongside his Ibiza Weekender co-star, David Potts. They reached the final day and were runners-up of the series, losing out to Kerry Katona and her daughter Lilly.

In February 2022, Izzard appeared on an episode of Eating with My Ex, on the newly relaunched BBC Three channel, where he went on a date with ex-girlfriend Lauren Warren in an attempt to rekindle their relationship. In June 2022, he was a contestant on Celebrity Karaoke Club and was the first contestant to be eliminated.

In February 2023, Izzard competed on the reality-competition series The Challenge UK.

Boxing career

Izzard vs Tinsadle 
In November 2022, Izzard after just a year of training competed in the PPV Standout TV Boxing event “Rage Combat” convincingly beating the more experienced James Tinsdale in a unanimous decision.

On 20 February 2023, it was announced Izzard had signed a multi-fight deal with Misfits Boxing.

Filmography

Boxing record

References

https://www.mirror.co.uk/3am/celebrity-news/callum-izzard-reveals-new-career-27822170

https://www.tapology.com/fightcenter/events/94601-rage-combat-boxing

External links
 

1995 births
Living people
People from Sheffield
Participants in British reality television series
The Challenge (TV series) contestants